Forrest Wheeler (born March 21, 2004) is an American actor.  In 2014, he was cast as Emery Huang, a series regular on the ABC comedy series Fresh Off the Boat.

Career
Wheeler began his acting career at the age of seven when he booked the role of a Cambodian boy in the film The Incredible Burt Wonderstone, opposite Steve Buscemi, who presented him with a rabbit as a pet that Wheeler's character took home to his family for dinner.

He performed on commercials and several television shows and movies before landing a role as a series regular on the ABC comedy series Fresh Off the Boat.  He plays the middle son of the Huang family alongside his television parents Randall Park and Constance Wu.

Wheeler appeared on the Hallmark Channel's Home and Family on March 3, 2015, where he talked about Fresh off the Boat.   The series premiered on February 4, 2015.

On October 28, 2015, Entertainment Weekly included Wheeler in the "12 Under 12: The Best Child Actors of 2015".

In 2016, Wheeler collaborated with Fresh off the Boat costars Hudson Yang, Ian Chen, and ISAtv (founded by Wong Fu Productions) to produce a web series focusing on the interests of the Asian American Youth community in the hope of inspiring the youth from all over the world to go out and be active and curious. In "The Forrest Wheeler Adventures" series, Wheeler goes on a quest to learn what it takes to become an action hero.

On December 19, 2017, Wheeler hosted Kore Asian Media's 16th annual "Unforgettable Gala's" Fresh Off the Carpet event where he interviewed award recipients and celebrities including Maggie Q and Ross Butler.

On August 8, 2018, The Hollywood Reporter named Wheeler among "Hollywood's Top 30 Stars Under Age 18".

Personal life
Wheeler was born on March 21, 2004, in Santa Monica, California to a Chinese-American mixed family.  He speaks Cantonese at home and studies Mandarin in school.  He graduated Campbell Hall School In 2022 and currently attends New York University.

Wheeler is a martial artist and competed in the 2014 US Open ISKA World Martial Arts Championship where he won seven 1st places.  He earned his first Karate black belt in 2015, and a second black belt in Extreme Martial Arts (XMA) in 2016.

Filmography

Television

Film

Awards

References

External links

2004 births
American male child actors
American male film actors
American male television actors
American male actors of Chinese descent
21st-century American male actors
Living people